Chevon Stephen Ray Troutman (born November 25, 1981) is an American professional basketball player. He is a 6'8" (2.02 m) tall power forward, who plays for Regatas Corrientes of the Liga Nacional de Básquet.

Career statistics

Domestic leagues

References

External links
 Chevon Troutman at lnb.fr 
 Chevon Troutman at eurobasket.com
 Chevon Troutman at euroleague.com
 Chevon Troutman at fiba.com

1981 births
Living people
African-American basketball players
American expatriate basketball people in Argentina
American expatriate basketball people in the Dominican Republic
American expatriate basketball people in France
American expatriate basketball people in Germany
American expatriate basketball people in Italy
American expatriate basketball people in Poland
American men's basketball players
ASVEL Basket players
Basket Livorno players
Basket Zielona Góra players
Basketball players from Pennsylvania
FC Bayern Munich basketball players
Orléans Loiret Basket players
Pittsburgh Panthers men's basketball players
Power forwards (basketball)
Regatas Corrientes basketball players
S.S. Felice Scandone players
Sportspeople from Williamsport, Pennsylvania
21st-century African-American sportspeople
20th-century African-American people